Pasla is a village in Jalandhar district of Punjab State, India. It is located 12.4 km from Nurmahal, 3.3 km from Rurka Kalan, 30.9 km from district headquarter Jalandhar and 127 km from state capital Chandigarh. The village is administrated by a sarpanch who is an elected representative of village as per Panchayati raj (India).

Transport 
Nurmahal railway station is the nearest train station however, Phillaur Junction train station is 13 km away from the village. The village is 45.3 km away from domestic airport in Ludhiana and the nearest international airport is located in Chandigarh also Sri Guru Ram Dass Jee International Airport is the second nearest airport which is 123 km away in Amritsar.it also has its own bus station.

Specialty 
Village Pasla is known for its baba Ami chand's dargah. many festivals are organised in this village. Especially the dussehra . Many villages get                   together for this festival and also every year a big carnival is held in dargah

Pasla also has a temple and gurdwaras . pasla has a quite big playground  .

Education 
The village has its own school which has classes over 12 .The school has a beautiful garden with playground and swing . not only student but all come here to play. there is a river at the outskirt of a village and lot of greenery is found there

Facilities 
Pasla has a hospital and many pharmacies and grocery shops. A bank is also near the village with an atm facility.

References

Villages in Jalandhar district